Ciliesta Catherine Shoana Motsepe is a South African Member of Parliament for the Economic Freedom Fighters. She was elected to parliament in 2019. As of June 2020, she is a member of the Portfolio Committee on Public Service and Administration.

Motsepe is also an additional member of the EFF's Central Command Team, its highest decision-making structure.

References

External links
National Assembly profile

Living people
Year of birth missing (living people)
Place of birth missing (living people)
People from Limpopo
Economic Freedom Fighters politicians
Members of the National Assembly of South Africa
Women members of the National Assembly of South Africa